In enzymology, an acetylacetone-cleaving enzyme is an enzyme that catalyzes the chemical reaction

pentane-2,4-dione + O2  acetate + 2-oxopropanal

Thus, the two substrates of this enzyme are pentane-2,4-dione and O2, whereas its two products are acetate and 2-oxopropanal.

This enzyme belongs to the family of oxidoreductases, specifically those acting on single donors with O2 as oxidant and incorporation of two atoms of oxygen into the substrate (oxygenases). The oxygen incorporated need not be derived from O2.  The systematic name of this enzyme class is acetylacetone:oxygen oxidoreductase. Other names in common use include Dke1, acetylacetone dioxygenase, diketone cleaving dioxygenase, and diketone cleaving enzyme.

References

 

EC 1.13.11
Enzymes of unknown structure